Hlaing Minn is an electrical engineer at the University of Texas at Dallas in Richardson, Texas. He was named a Fellow of the Institute of Electrical and Electronics Engineers (IEEE) in 2016 for his contributions to synchronization and channel estimation in communication systems.

References 

Fellow Members of the IEEE
Living people
21st-century American engineers
Year of birth missing (living people)
Place of birth missing (living people)
American electrical engineers